Elmer George Sexauer (May 21, 1926 – June 27, 2011) was a Major League Baseball right-handed pitcher.  He was an alumnus of Wake Forest University.

Sexauer made his Major League Baseball debut with the Brooklyn Dodgers on September 6, 1948, and appeared in his final game on September 12, 1948.

The book Carl Erskine's Tales from the Dodgers Dugout: Extra Innings (2004) includes short stories from former Dodger pitcher Carl Erskine.  Sexauer is prominent in one of these stories, entitled "Elmer and Jocko".  The story chronicles a memorable interaction between Sexauer and Hall of Fame umpire Jocko Conlan.  An unknown Dodger had thrown a towel on the field towards Conlan, however, Conlan did not spot the culprit.  The umpire approached Dodger manager Burt Shotton, informing him that someone was going to be ejected for the incident.  Although Shotton was also unaware of who threw the towel, he offered up Sexauer to Conlan, since Sexauer was a rookie who had just been brought up from the minors.  Before having thrown a single pitch in the majors, Sexauer had been ejected.  Although he had not thrown the towel, Sexauer left the field to a chorus of boos from the opposing crowd.

External links

1926 births
2011 deaths
Baseball players from Missouri
Brooklyn Dodgers players
Danville Dodgers players
Major League Baseball pitchers
Sportspeople from St. Louis County, Missouri
Wake Forest University alumni